Demequina is a genus of bacteria in the phylum Actinomycetota.

Etymology
The name Demequina derives from:
 New Latin feminine gender noun Demequina, arbitrary name derived from demethylmenaquinone, an unusual quinone found in this organism.

Species
Demequina comprises the following species:

 D. activiva Park et al. 2015
 D. aestuarii Yi et al. 2007
 D. aurantiaca Ue et al. 2011
 D. flava Hamada et al. 2013
 D. gelatinilytica (Hamada et al. 2015) Nouioui et al. 2018
 D. globuliformis Ue et al. 2011
 D. iriomotensis (Hamada et al. 2015) Nouioui et al. 2018
 D. litorisediminis Park et al. 2016
 D. lutea Finster et al. 2009
 D. mangrovi (Hamada et al. 2012) Nouioui et al. 2018
 D. maris Nouioui et al. 2018
 D. oxidasica Ue et al. 2011
 D. pelophila (Hamada et al. 2015) Nouioui et al. 2018
 D. phytophila Nouioui et al. 2018
 D. rhizosphaerae (Hamada et al. 2015) Nouioui et al. 2018
 D. salsinemoris Matsumoto et al. 2010
 D. sediminicola Hamada et al. 2013
 D. sediminis (Hamada et al. 2017) Yang and Zhi 2020
 D. silvatica Nouioui et al. 2018
 D. soli (Hamada et al. 2015) Nouioui et al. 2018
 D. subtropica (Hamada et al. 2015) Nouioui et al. 2018

Phylogeny
The currently accepted taxonomy is based on the List of Prokaryotic names with Standing in Nomenclature (LPSN)
and the phylogeny is based on 16S rRNA-based LTP release 106 by The All-Species Living Tree Project

See also
 Bacterial taxonomy
 Microbiology

References 

Bacteria genera
Micrococcales